The following elections occurred in the year 1911.

Africa
 Liberian general election
 Mauritius general election
 Southern Rhodesian Legislative Council election

Europe
 Bulgarian Constitutional Assembly election
 Bulgarian parliamentary election
 Cisleithanian legislative election
 Finnish parliamentary election
 Portuguese Constituent National Assembly election
 Swedish general election
 Swiss federal election

United Kingdom
 Arfon by-election
 Bootle by-election

North America

Canada
 Canadian federal election
 Edmonton municipal by-election
 Nova Scotia general election
 Ontario general election
 Toronto municipal election

United States
 Senate election in New York

Oceania

Australia
 Constitutional referendum
 Western Australian state election

New Zealand
 General election
 Christchurch North by-election

See also
 :Category:1911 elections

1911
Elections